Jeng may refer to:

the Jeng language

People
Jeng Jundian
Jeng Tian-tsair
Alhaji Jeng
Jeng Kirchen